Hieracium triangulare is a species of flowering plant belonging to the family Asteraceae.

Synonym:
 Hieracium silvaticum subsp. triangulare Almq.

References

triangulare